Live Unplugged is an album by Jeremy Camp.

Track listing

Mainstay
Mainstay was the opening act in many locations of this tour. They played some of their own singles and some songs off of Arriving, an album from Chris Tomlin.

Accolades

In 2007, the album was nominated for a Dove Award, for Long Form Music Video of the Year, at the 38th GMA Dove Awards.

Personnel
Drums: Leif Skartland
Bass: Michael Martin
Guitar: Randy Williams
Guitar: Jared Camp
Piano/keys: Justin Glasco
Strings: The Nashville String Machine; arranged and conducted by Tom Howard
Background Vocals: Adrienne Camp

Production 
DVD Director: Carl Diebold
DVD Producers: Ken Conrad and Michael Sacci of Jupiter Project
Audio Produced & Mixed by Adam Watts and Andy Dodd for Reddecibleproductions.com
Executive Producer: Tyson Paoletti
A&R: Brandon Ebel
Mastered by Fred Paragano at Paragon Studio
Photos by Jeremy Cowart
Lighting/Set Design: Tony Fransen
Recorded live at W274 in Franklin, TN
Management: Matt Balm

References 

2005 live albums
Jeremy Camp albums
BEC Recordings albums